The Royal Mining Engineering Jubilee Exhibition was held in 1887 (delayed from planned 1886 opening) at Newcastle's Town Moor, Newcastle upon Tyne and Bull Park (renamed the Exhibition Park later in 1929.

Summary
Over two million people attended, and the fair made money. It was opened in May 1887 by the Duke of Cambridge and closed 28 October 1887.

There was a two-storey refreshment pavilion, a two thirds size
replica of the old Tyne Bridge, gardens, a theatre and art galleries.

References

External links
 Image of the replica Tyne Bridge
 Bandstand

1887 in England